U of Q may refer to:

Université du Québec, a system of ten provincially run public universities in Quebec, Canada
University of Queensland, a public university located in Brisbane, Australia

See also
 UQ (disambiguation)